Loud, Proud & Heavy: The Best of Uriah Heep is a 2007 3CD compilation of tracks spanning the history of Uriah Heep from 1970 to 1991.

Track listing

CD1
"Gypsy"
"Come Away Melinda"
"Wake Up (Set Your Sights)"
"Bird of Prey"
"High Priestess"
"Lady in Black"
"Love Machine"
"July Morning"
"Look at Yourself"
"Tears in My Eyes"
"The Magician's Birthday"
"The Wizard"
"Rainbow Demon"
"Easy Livin'"

CD2
"Sweet Freedom"
"Stealin'"
"Return to Fantasy"
"Misty Eyes"
"One Way or Another"
"Can't Keep a Good Band Down"
"The Hanging Tree"
"Firefly"
"Been Away Too Long"
"Wise Man"
"Free Me
"Illusion"
"Free 'N' Easy"
"I'm Alive"
"Woman of the Night"

CD3
"Fallen Angel"
"Been Hurt"
"Love or Nothing"
"Come Back to Me"
"Think It Over"
"Love Stealer"
"Feelings"
"Too Scared to Run"
"Running All Night (With the Lion)"
"Hot Persuasion"
"On the Rebound"
"That's the Way That It Is"
"Stay on Top"
"Heartache City" (live)
"Hold Your Head Up"
"Stand Back"
"Different World"

References

2007 greatest hits albums
Uriah Heep (band) compilation albums